Branislav Bajić (born 5 May 1977) is a Serbian former professional footballer who played as a defender.

Career
After playing for Zemun in his homeland, Bajić moved abroad to Spanish club Xerez in 2003. He made over 100 Segunda División appearances over the course of next five seasons. Later in his career, Bajić played for Spanish lower league clubs San Fernando, Portuense and Xerez Deportivo.

After hanging up his boots, Bajić returned to Serbia and served as manager of Dunav Stari Banovci, Inđija and Kolubara.

References

External links
 
 
 
 

1977 births
Living people
Association football defenders
Expatriate footballers in Greece
Expatriate footballers in Spain
First League of Serbia and Montenegro players
FK Metalac Gornji Milanovac players
FK Zemun players
Football League (Greece) players
Ionikos F.C. players
People from Zemun
Racing Club Portuense players
San Fernando CD players
Segunda División players
Serbia and Montenegro expatriate footballers
Serbia and Montenegro expatriate sportspeople in Spain
Serbia and Montenegro footballers
Serbian expatriate footballers
Serbian expatriate sportspeople in Greece
Serbian expatriate sportspeople in Spain
Serbian football managers
Serbian footballers
Serbian SuperLiga players
Tercera División players
Xerez CD footballers
Xerez Deportivo FC footballers